Window Blind Peak is a 7,030-foot (2,140 meter) elevation summit located in the San Rafael Swell of Emery County, Utah, U.S. Towering 1,800 feet above its surrounding terrain, it is the highest point of the Mexican Mountain Wilderness Study Area. Ownership is administered by the Bureau of Land Management. Precipitation runoff from this feature drains north into the nearby San Rafael River. The first ascent of this peak was made September 23, 1973, by Jim Langdon, Dale Black, and Dave Palmer via the West Face.

Geology
This major erosional remnant along the San Rafael River is composed of Wingate Sandstone, which is the remains of wind-borne sand dunes deposited approximately 200 million years ago in the Late Triassic, overlain by Kayenta Formation, and capped by Jurassic Navajo Sandstone. Lightly-colored slopes of Chinle Formation are exposed in places around the base of the mountain.

Climate
Spring and fall are the most favorable seasons to visit Window Blind Peak. According to the Köppen climate classification system, it is located in a Cold semi-arid climate zone, which is defined by the coldest month having an average mean temperature below 32 °F (0 °C), and at least 50% of the total annual precipitation being received during the spring and summer.

See also
 Colorado Plateau

References

External links
 Weather forecast: National Weather Service
 Window Blind Peak rock climbing: Mountainproject.com
 Window Blind Peak, North Rib: YouTube

Mountains of Utah
Landforms of Emery County, Utah
San Rafael Swell
Geology of Utah
Colorado Plateau
Protected areas of Emery County, Utah
Bureau of Land Management areas in Utah
North American 2000 m summits